The 12th Asianet Film Awards, honors the best films in 2009 and was held on 16 January 2010 at Chandrasekharan Nair Stadium, Thiruvananthapuram. The winners were announced on 3 January 2010 by Asianet senior vice-president R. Sreekantan Nair. The title sponsor of the event was Ujala. The award were given in 25 categories.

Winners
 Best Film: Pazhassi Raja
 Best Director: Ranjith for Paleri Manikyam: Oru Pathirakolapathakathinte Katha
 Best Actor: Mohanlal for Ividam Swargamaanu, Bhramaram
 Best Actress: Kavya Madhavan for Banaras
 Best Supporting Actor: Sreenivasan for Makante Achan, Passenger
 Best Supporting Actress: Shwetha Menon for Paleri Manikyam: Oru Pathirakolapathakathinte Katha
 Best Screenplay: Ranjith Sankar for Passenger
 Best Cinematographer: Ajayan Vincent for Bhramaram
 Best Editor: Vijay Shanker for Bhramaram
 Best Music Director: Deepak Dev for Puthiya Mukham
 Best Lyricist: Vayalar Sarath Chandra Varma for Neelathamara
 Best Male Playback Singer: Shankar Mahadevan for "Picha Vacha" (Puthiya Mukham)
 Best Female Playback Singer: K. S. Chithra for "Kunnathe Konnakkum" (Pazhassi Raja)
 Most Popular Actor: Dileep for  Pappy Appacha, Kaaryasthan, Marykkundoru Kunjaadu
 Most Popular Actress: Lakshmi Rai for Ividam Swargamaanu 
 Best Actor in a Villain Role: Lalu Alex for Ividam Swargamaanu
 Best Actor in a Comic Role: Jagadish for 2 Harihar Nagar
 Best Star Pair: Jayasurya & Roma for Utharaswayamvaram
 Best Child Artist: Baby Nivedita for Bhramaram, Kana Kanmani
 Best New Face of the Year (Male): Nishan for Ritu
 Best New Face of the Year (Female): Archana Jose Kavi for Neelathamara
 Special Jury Awards
 R. Sarathkumar for Pazhassi Raja
 Manoj K. Jayan for Pazhassi Raja
 Kanika for Pazhassi Raja, Bhagyadevatha
 Special Award for his notable contribution for the Indian Film World: Resul Pookutty
 Millennium Actor: Mammootty
 Youth Icon of the Year: Prithviraj Sukumaran
 Lifetime Achievement Award: P. V. Gangadharan

References

External links
https://web.archive.org/web/20160303172753/http://www.keralatv.in/2010/01/ujala-asianet-film-awards-2010-announced/
http://www.expressbuzz.com/edition/story.aspx?Title=Kerala:+Ujala-Asianet+film+awards+announced&artid=rJBl1uotmsQ=&SectionID=1ZkF/jmWuSA=&MainSectionID=1ZkF/jmWuSA=&SectionName=X7s7i|xOZ5Y=&SEO=M%20T%20Vasudevan%20Nair,%20Mohanlal,%20Mammootty,%20R%20Sreekan

2009 Indian film awards
Asianet Film Awards